A humid continental climate  is a climatic region defined by Russo-German climatologist Wladimir Köppen in 1900, typified by four distinct seasons and large seasonal temperature differences, with warm to hot (and often humid) summers and cold (sometimes severely cold in the northern areas) winters.  Precipitation is usually distributed throughout the year but often does have dry seasons. The definition of this climate regarding temperature is as follows: the mean temperature of the coldest month must be below  or  depending on the isotherm,  and there must be at least four months whose mean temperatures are at or above . In addition, the location in question must not be semi-arid or arid. The cooler Dfb, Dwb, and Dsb subtypes are also known as hemiboreal climates.

Humid continental climates are generally found between latitudes 40° N and 60° N, within the central and northeastern portions of North America, Europe, and Asia. They are rare and isolated in the Southern Hemisphere, due to the larger ocean area at that latitude, smaller land mass, and the consequent greater maritime moderation. In the Northern Hemisphere, some of the humid continental climates, typically in Hokkaido, Northern Honshu, Sakhalin island, northeastern mainland Europe, Scandinavia, Nova Scotia, and Newfoundland are closer to the sea and is heavily maritime-influenced and comparable to oceanic climates, with relatively cool summers and winters being just below the freezing mark (too cold for such a classification). More extreme and inland humid continental climates found in northeast China, southern Siberia, the Korean Peninsula (except for the southern region in South Korea) and the Canadian Prairies, where temperatures in the winter resemble those of subarctic climates but have warmer and longer summers. In east-central China, southern South Korea, the Great Lakes region of the American Midwest, New England, and southern parts of Central Canada the climate combines hotter summer maxima and colder winters than the marine-based variety and are less extreme than the most inland variety, with similarities to the adjacent humid subtropical climate but with colder winters which preclude such classifications.

Definition

These temperatures were not arbitrary. In Europe, the  average temperature isotherm (line of equal temperature) was near the southern extent of winter snowpack. In the United States, it is more common to use the  isotherm instead. The  average temperature was found to be roughly the minimum temperature necessary for tree reproduction and growth. Wide temperature ranges are common within this climate zone.

Second letter in the classification symbol defines seasonal rainfall as follows: 
 s: A dry summer—the driest month in the high-sun half of the year (April to September in the Northern Hemisphere, October to March in the Southern Hemisphere) has less than / of rainfall and has exactly or less than  the precipitation of the wettest month in the low-sun half of the year (October to March in the Northern Hemisphere, April to September in the Southern Hemisphere).
 w: A dry winter—the driest month in the low-sun half of the year has exactly or less than one‑tenth of the precipitation found in the wettest month in the summer half of the year.
 f: No dry season—does not meet either of the alternative specifications above; precipitation and humidity are often high year-round.
while the third letter denotes the extent of summer heat:
 a: Hot summer, warmest month averages at least ,
 b: Warm summer, warmest month averages below  but at least four months averages above .

Associated precipitation
Within North America, moisture within this climate regime is supplied by the Great Lakes, Gulf of Mexico and adjacent western subtropical Atlantic. Precipitation is relatively well distributed year-round in many areas with this climate (f), while others may see a marked reduction in wintry precipitation, which increases the chances of a wintertime drought (w).  Snowfall occurs in all areas with a humid continental climate and in many such places is more common than rain during the height of winter. In places with sufficient wintertime precipitation, the snow cover is often deep. Most summer rainfall occurs during thunderstorms, and in North America and Asia an occasional tropical system. Though humidity levels are often high in locations with humid continental climates, the "humid" designation means that the climate is not dry enough to be classified as semi-arid or arid.

Vegetation

By definition, forests thrive within this climate. Biomes within this climate regime include temperate woodlands, temperate grasslands, temperate deciduous or evergreen forests, coniferous forests, and coniferous swamps. Within wetter areas, maple, spruce, pine, fir, and oak can be found. Fall foliage is noted during the autumn of deciduous forests.

Hot summer subtype 

A hot summer version of a continental climate features an average temperature of at least  in its warmest month. Since these regimes are limited to the Northern Hemisphere, the warmest month is usually July or August.  High temperatures in the warmest month tend to be in the high 20s or low 30s °C (80s or low 90s °F), while average January afternoon temperatures are near or well below freezing. Frost free periods normally last 4–7 months within this climate regime.

Within North America, this climate includes small areas of central and southeast Canada (including Essex County, the core area of the Golden Horseshoe and Greater Montreal) and portions of the central and eastern United States from 100°W eastward to the Atlantic. Precipitation increases further eastward in this zone and is less seasonally uniform in the west. The western states of the central United States (namely Montana, Wyoming, parts of southern Idaho, most of Lincoln County in Eastern Washington, parts of Colorado, parts of Utah, western Nebraska, and parts of western North and South Dakota) have thermal regimes which fit the Dfa climate type, but are quite dry, and are generally grouped with the steppe (BSk) climates. In the eastern United States Pennsylvania, Ohio, Illinois, Indiana, New York, and Massachusetts have this type of climate. 

In the Eastern Hemisphere, this climate regime is found within interior Eurasia, east-central Asia, and parts of India. Within Europe, the Dfa climate type is present near the Black Sea in southern Ukraine, the Southern Federal District of Russia, southern Moldova, Serbia, parts of southern Romania, and Bulgaria, but tends to be drier and can be even semi-arid in these places. In East Asia, this climate exhibits a monsoonal tendency with much higher precipitation in summer than in winter, and due to the effects of the strong Siberian High much colder winter temperatures than similar latitudes around the world, however with lower snowfall, the exception being western Japan with its heavy snowfall.  Tōhoku, between Tokyo and Hokkaidō and Western coast of Japan also has a climate with Köppen classification Dfa, but is wetter even than that part of North America with this climate type. A variant which has dry winters and hence relatively lower snowfall with monsoonal type summer rainfall is to be found in northern China including Manchuria and parts of North China, and over much of the Korean Peninsula; it has the Köppen classification Dwa. Much of central Asia, northwestern China, and southern Mongolia has a thermal regime similar to that of the Dfa climate type, but these regions receive so little precipitation that they are more often classified as steppes (BSk) or deserts (BWk).

Dsa climates are rare; they are generally restricted to elevated areas adjacent to Mediterranean climate regions with a Csa climate well inland to ensure hot summers and cold winters. They are generally found in the highly elevated areas of south-eastern Turkey (Hakkâri), north-western Iran and parts of Central Asia.

This climate zone does not exist at all in the southern hemisphere, where the only landmass that enters the upper-middle latitudes, South America, tapers too much to have any place that gets the combination of snowy winters and hot summers. Marine influences preclude Dfa, Dwa, and Dsa climates in the southern hemisphere.

Warm summer subtype 

Also known as Hemiboreal climate, areas featuring this subtype of the continental climate have an average temperature in the warmest month below . Frost-free periods typically last 3–5 months. Heat spells lasting over a week are rare.

The warm summer version of the humid continental climate covers a much larger area than the hot subtype. In North America, the climate zone covers from about 42°N to 50°N latitude mostly east of 100°W, including parts of Southern Ontario, the southern half of Quebec, The Maritimes, and Newfoundland, as well as the northern United States from eastern North Dakota east to Maine. However, it can be found as far north as 54°N, and further west in the Canadian Prairie Provinces and below 40°N in the high Appalachians. In Europe, this subtype reaches its most northerly latitude in Bodø at the 67°N.

High-altitude locations such as Aspen, Colorado and Los Alamos, New Mexico in the western United States exhibit local Dfb climates. The south-central and southwestern Prairie Provinces also fits the Dfb criteria from a thermal profile, but because of semi-arid precipitation portions of it are grouped into the BSk category.  

In Europe, it is found in much of Central Europe: Germany (in the east and southeast part of the country), Austria (generally below ), Poland, Czech Republic, Slovakia, Hungary (generally above ), Croatia (mostly Slavonia region), in much of Eastern Europe: Ukraine (the whole country except the Black Sea coast), Belarus, Russia (mostly central part of European Russia), south and central parts of Scandinavia not bathed by the Atlantic Ocean or North Sea: Sweden (historical regions of Svealand and Götaland), Denmark, Finland (south end, including the three largest cities), Norway (most populated area),, all Baltic States:  Estonia, Latvia, Lithuania and also in parts of: Romania (generally above ), Bosnia and Herzegovina, Turkey and in the Cairngorm Mountains of Scotland, (generally above ). It has little warming or precipitation effects from the northern Atlantic. The cool summer subtype is marked by mild summers, long cold winters and less precipitation than the hot summer subtype; however, short periods of extreme heat are not uncommon. Northern Japan has a similar climate.

In the Southern Hemisphere, it exists in well-defined areas only in the Southern Alps of New Zealand, in the Snowy Mountains of Australia in Kiandra, New South Wales and the Andes Mountains of Argentina and Chile.

Use in climate modeling
Since climate regimes tend to be dominated by vegetation of one region with relatively homogenous ecology, those that project climate change remap their results in the form of climate regimes as an alternative way to explain expected changes.

See also
Continental climate
Subarctic climate
Hemiboreal

References 

Köppen climate types
Climate of North America
Climate of Europe
Climate of Asia